Christ the King Cathedral School (CTK) is a Catholic school in Lubbock, Texas.  CTK was established in 1957. CTK's curriculum ranges from pre-kindergarten through twelfth grade.  CTK's high school is the only Catholic high school in the diocese. CTK is accredited by the Texas Catholic Conference of Accreditation Commission. CTK is a Catholic School which has classes of Pre-K to 12th grade.  In 2020 the school separated the High School to a Diocesan High School.  The new mascot is the Golden Lion.  In 2022 the whole school became a Diocesan school.

References

External links 
 Christ the King Cathedral School
 Two area teens win region science fair

Catholic secondary schools in Texas
Educational institutions established in 1957
High schools in Lubbock, Texas
Private K-12 schools in Texas
1957 establishments in Texas